George Șoltuz (born 2 October 1977) is a former Romanian football player.

External links
 

1977 births
Living people
Romanian footballers
AFC Rocar București players
FC Universitatea Cluj players
FC Politehnica Timișoara players
CSM Jiul Petroșani players
ACF Gloria Bistrița players
FC Vaslui players
Association football defenders